The Volkswagen Masters-China was an event that was played on the Asian Tour from 2004 to 2006. It was played in Beijing, China. The purse was $300,000. The only multiple winner of the event was Retief Goosen, who won the event back-to-back in 2005 and 2006.

Winners
 

Former Asian Tour events
Golf tournaments in China